Thomas Zigal is an American writer.

Early life 
Zigal was born in Galveston, Texas. He grew up in Texas City.  He attended high school in Lafayette, Louisiana and lived in New Orleans for four years in  the 1980s and 1990s.  Zigal was a victim of Hurricane Carla, which destroyed the family home in Texas City when he was a child.

Career 
As of 2014, he lived in Austin, Texas.

Recognition 
In 2014 Zigal won the Jesse Jones Award given by the Texas Institute of Letters in the  fiction category for his 2013 novel, Many Rivers to Cross.  Judges cited his  "keen ear for the language of Hurricane Katrina victims, most of whom were African-Americans." 

Many Rivers to Cross is the story of two grandfathers trying to find their common grandchildren in the aftermath of Hurricane Katrina.

Zigal is the author of the Kurt Muller Mysteries, a series of crime novels set in Aspen, Colorado, and of a literary thriller, The White League.  The White League is the first of his projected series of New Orleans novels.  Many Rivers to Cross is the second novel in the series.

Books
 Many Rivers to Cross (TCU Press, 2013)

References

Year of birth missing (living people)
Living people
American male novelists
21st-century American novelists
21st-century American male writers
People from Galveston, Texas
Novelists from Texas
American mystery novelists
People from Texas City, Texas